Nikolai Islenev (1785–1851) was an Imperial Russian division commander. He fought in wars against the First French Empire and the Ottoman Empire. He took in the suppression of the uprising in Poland. In 1820, his wife died giving birth to his son, who died in 1822 at the age of 2.

Sources 
 
 Волков С. В. Генералитет Российской империи. Энциклопедический словарь генералов и адмиралов от Петра I до Николая II. Том II. Л—Я. М., 2009
 Милорадович Г. А. Список лиц свиты их величеств с царствования императора Петра I по 1886 год. СПб., 1886
 Развёртка шаблонов // Русский биографический словарь : в 25 томах. — Санкт-Петербур—Москва, 1896–1918.
 Список генералам по старшинству. Исправлено по 20 июня. СПб., 1840

1785 births
1851 deaths
Russian Empire people of the November Uprising
Burials at Lazarevskoe Cemetery (Saint Petersburg)
Military personnel of the Russian Empire